Three Moments of an Explosion: Stories is a collection of short stories by British author China Miéville. It was published in the U.K. by Pan Macmillan on 30 July 2015, and in the U.S. by Del Rey Books on 4 August 2015. It features twenty-eight short stories, ten of which had been published previously.

Stories
Three Moments of an Explosion contains the following stories:

A number of the stories have been previously published. These include "The Rope is the World" (on iconeye.com, February 2010), "Covehithe" (on guardian.co.uk, 22 April 2011), "Estate" (in The White Review issue 8, August 2013), "The 9th Technique" (in The Apology Chapbook given out for free at the World Fantasy Convention 2013), "The Design" (in McSweeney's Quarterly Concern issue 45, December 2013), "Polynia" (on tor.com, July 2014), and "Säcken" (in Subtropics issue 17, Winter/Spring 2014).

In addition, the stories "Three Moments of an Explosion", "The Crawl", and "Four Final Orpheuses" were first published on the author's blog Rejectamentalist Manifesto.

The remaining eighteen stories are new to this collection.

Reception

Publishers Weekly gave the book a starred review, saying Miéville "moves effortlessly among realism, fantasy, and surrealism in this dark, sometimes horrific short story collection" and that the stories' characters are "invariably well drawn and compelling". The review concludes by stating that "what the stories have in common is a sense that the world is not just strange, but stranger than we can ever really comprehend."

Kirkus Reviews also gave a starred review, stating that in the book, "horror, noir, fantasy, politics, and poetry swirl into combinations as satisfying intellectually as they are emotionally". The review summarized Miéville's style as "Bradbury meets Borges, with Lovecraft gibbering tumultuously just out of hearing."

Adaptations 
The short story "Estate" was adapted into a 20 minute movie, due to be released in 2019.

References

2015 short story collections
British short story collections
Works by China Miéville
Del Rey books
Pan Books books